The Biggest Loser UK 2011 is the fourth season of the reality television series entitled The Biggest Loser.  The season began airing on ITV on 10 January 2011, with seven overweight couples (fourteen individuals) competing for a cash prize of £25,000. Davina McCall is featured as the new host, with trainers Angie Dowds and Richard Callender.

Contestants

Teams

Couples Teams (Week 1-3)

Black vs Blue (Week 4-7)

Weigh-Ins

Winners
 £25,000 Winner (among the finalists)
 Holiday Winner (among the non-finalists)
Standings.
 Week's Biggest Loser/Highest Percentage Weight Loss (Finalist)
 Week's Biggest Loser & Immunity.
 Immunity (Challenge or Weigh-In).
 Highest Percentage Weight Loss (Non-finalist).

Weigh-In Figures History

Weigh-In Percentages History

Elimination Voting History

Ratings
Episode Viewing figures from BARB

References

External links

2011 British television seasons
UK